The Superpesis, known as SM-sarja from 1955 to 1989, is the top professional pesäpallo league in Finland. It was created in 1990 to replace the SM-sarja which was fundamentally an amateur league. The Superpesis is directly overseen by the Finnish Pesäpallo Association.

Both the men's and women's top division is called Superpesis. Comprising 13 teams in the men's league and 12 teams in the women's league, one team faces relegation to Ykköspesis at the end of the season. Superpesis was founded in 1990; before that the top division was called SM-sarja (Finnish Championship).

Most popular in semi-urban and rural municipalities, along with some notability in larger cities like Tampere and Oulu, the pesäpallo matches gain a significant number of attendances compared to the population in the area.

Clubs
The Superpesis clubs in the 2022 season are (with their home towns in brackets):

Men

Past participants

Relegated 
Teams relegated were relegated to second-tier Ykköspesis in the year shown, and are there today unless noted otherwise.
 Vaasan Maila (relegated 1992)
 Muhoksen Pallo-Salamat (relegated 1994,)
 Riihimäen Pallonlyöjät (relegated 1995)
 Haapajärven Pesä-Kiilat (relegated 1998)
 Juvan Pallo (relegated 1998, now Juvan Nuorisopesis)
 Loimaan Palloilijat (relegated 2001)
 Kinnarin Pesis (relegated 2004, now Kinnarin Pesis 2006)
 Puijon Pesis (relegated 2009
 Ulvilan Pesä-Veikot (relegated 2010)
 Jyväskylän Kiri (relegated 2016)
 Oulun Lippo (relegated 2018)
 Alajärven Ankkurit (relegated 2019)
 Haminan Palloilijat (relegated 2021)

Withdrew from league 
 Kaisaniemen Tiikerit (went bankrupt at the end of 1998)
 Seinäjoen Maila-Jussit (left after 2008)
 Nurmon Jymy (left after 2012)
 Siilinjärven pesis (left after 2021)

Women

Past participants

Relegated 
Teams relegated were relegated to second-tier Ykköspesis in the year shown, and are there today unless noted otherwise.
 Kokemäen Kova-Väki (relegated 1991)
 Ikaalisten Tarmo (relegated 1996)
 Vähänkyrön Viesti (relegated 1997)
 Haminan Palloilijat (relegated 2007)
 Tyrnävän Tempaus (relegated 2009)
 Jyväskylän Valo (relegated 2010)
 Lappajärven Veikot (relegated 2019)
 Mynämäen Vesa (relegated 2021)
 Pesä Ysit (relegated 2021)
 Siilinjärven Pesis (relegated 2021)

Withdrew from league 
 Kajaanin Hymy (left after 2001)
 Vimpelin Veto (left after 2002)
 Hämeenlinnan Paukku (left after 2003)
 Pattijoen Urheilijat (left after 2003)
 Peräseinäjoen Toive (left after 2004)
 Sotkamon Jymy (left after 2006)
 Ylihärmän Pesis-Junkkarit (left after 2012)
 PeTo-Jussit (left after 2012)
 Turku-Pesis (left after 2013)
 Vuokatin Veto (left after 2014)
 Kankaanpään Maila (left after 2015)
 Vihdin Pallo (left after 2016)
 Viinijärven Urheilijat (left after 2016)
 Kajaanin Pallokerho (left after 2017)
 Oulun Lipottaret (left after 2018)

List of champions

Championship Series 1922–1989

Superpesis

See also
Finnish pesäpallo match-fixing scandal

References

External links

Official website

Pesäpallo
Sports leagues established in 1990
1990 establishments in Finland
Professional sports leagues in Finland